George Hancock (June 13, 1754July 18, 1820) was an American planter and lawyer from Virginia. He represented Virginia as a Federalist in the U.S. House from 1793 to 1797.

Biography
He was born in Chesterfield County in the Colony of Virginia to George and Mary (Jones) Hancock. George Hancock was appointed a colonel in the Virginia militia, where he served as aide de camp to Count Casimir Pulaski. When General Pulaski was mortally wounded at the battle of Savannah, it was Colonel Hancock that pulled the general off of his horse.  George Hancock married Margaret Strother in 1781.  It was in that year that Hancock purchased 300 acres in and around Fincastle, Virginia, that was to become Santillane.  Work began in 1795 on Santillane using George Hancock's slaves. The exterior was completed around 1800 using bricks fired on site.  The interior was probably completed a couple of years later.  The first documented reference to the residence as "Satillane", was on a letter head dated 1805 that was sent by Margaret Hancock. George and Margaret Hancock's daughter, Julia, married General William Clark at Santillane on January 5, 1808, upon his return from exploring the Louisiana Territory with Meriwether Lewis.  The newlyweds lived left Santillane in the spring of 1808 for St. Louis, so General Clark could become the Superintendent of Indian Affairs and Commander of Militia in the Missouri/Louisiana territory.  Sometime in 1811, a roof fire began at Santillane. Though it's unknown how extreme the damage was to the house, it must have been enough for the family to evacuate. Hancock, along with his wife Peggy and son George moved on to Fotheringay, selling Santillane to Henry Bowyer.

In 1796, Hancock purchased the Fotheringay property near Elliston, Virginia.  The Fotheringay house was listed on the National Register of Historic Places in 1969.

Electoral history

1793; Hancock was elected to the U.S. House of Representatives with 60.47% of the vote, defeating Independents Caleb Munsey and Charles Clay.
1795; Hancock was re-elected unopposed.

References

"The Fincastle Herald" May 18, 2005;  "The Roanoker Magazine" May 1988

External links
Hancock's Congressional biography

1754 births
1820 deaths
People from Chesterfield County, Virginia
Virginia lawyers
American planters
Federalist Party members of the United States House of Representatives from Virginia
American slave owners
19th-century American lawyers